Kerberos ("Cerberus") is an extinct genus of hyainailourid hyaenodonts in polyphyletic tribe Hyainailourini within paraphyletic subfamily Hyainailourinae, that lived in Europe. It contains the single species Kerberos langebadreae.

Etymology 
The genus name Kerberos comes from Cerberus, the hound of Hades, a multi-headed dog that guards the entrance to the Underworld in Greek mythology. The species name, Kerberos langebadreae, is dedicated to the French palaeontologist Dr. Brigitte Lange-Badré, who contributed extensively to the knowledge of Eocene carnivorous mammals.

Description 
Kerberos langebadreae is the only currently known species from genus Kerberos, and it was an extinct large-bodied carnivorous mammal from the Eocene of France. It represents one of the oldest members of the subfamily Hyainailourinae that have been recorded in Europe.

Many hyaenodont species are known only from fragments of the jaw or a few teeth. K. langebadreae represents the first instance where cranial, dental and postcranial material of an early hyainailourine have been found associated with each other. The material that has been referred to K. langebadreae includes a nearly complete cranium, left and right halves of the lower jaw, a fibula and several foot bones including the astragalus, calcaneus, metatarsals 1-3 and two middle phalanxes.

K. langebadreae displays both primitive and derived features. Among the former is the anteriorly narrow jaw and the small space between the first and second lower premolars. The derived features include a premaxilla that is narrow along is full length as well as several dental characteristics. The skull of K. langebadreae is about 35 cm long, similar in size to that of a female brown bear. The snout is very short. The shape of the skull indicates large jaw muscles, suggesting that K. langebadreae had a powerful bite. The molars of K. langebadreae were cutting whereas the premolars display a shape and wear pattern more consistent with crushing action.

Body mass 
Kerberos langebadreae was a large hyaenodont and is thought to have weighed around 140 kg based on measurements of the teeth, skull and astragalus. This makes K. langebadreae one of the largest carnivores known from the Eocene of Europe.

Ecology 
Montespieu, the locality where Kerberos langebadreae was found, is part of the “Castrais” fauna which is thought to be of Bartonian age.

Both Kerberos and Paroxyaena were much larger than the proviverrid hyaenodonts that lived in Europe at the same time and are therefore unlikely to have been in direct competition with them. The small proviverrids may have even been their prey. Based on the neck vertebrae of closely related hyaenodonts, it is thought that Kerberos langebadreae and its relatives had powerful necks which allowed them to restrain struggling prey. This, together with the powerful jaw muscles and crushing premolars, suggests that K. langebadreae was capable of both hunting and scavenging similarly to the modern spotted hyena. Unlike the modern hyena, however, the foot bones of K. langebadreae indicate that it had a plantigrade posture and was not an efficient runner. K. langebadreae likely preyed on animals which were larger than itself, such as ungulates like Choeropotamus, Lophiodon and Palaeotherium. Because of its large size it would have been an important apex predator.

Classification and phylogeny

Relations 
The species Kerberos langebadreae was created along with the genus in 2015 by Solé and colleagues based on a fossil skull, lower jaw and a number of associated hindlimb elements. The fossils were discovered in 1981 by Dominique Vidalenc at Montespieu, near the city of Lautrec in the department of Tarn in southern France. They were shown to come from a hyaenodont and were referred to a new genus and species. 

The original study placed K. langebadreae within the subfamily Hyainailourinae. More recent studies, using Bayesian tip dating, placed Kerberos langebadreae as the sister group to Pterodon dasyuroides.

The phylogenetic relationships of gebus Kerberos are shown in the following cladogram:

See also 
 Mammal classification
 Hyainailourini

References 

Hyaenodonts
Prehistoric mammals of Europe
Prehistoric mammal genera